Martin Fournier may refer to:

Martin Fournier (filmmaker), Canadian documentary filmmaker
Martin Fournier (gymnast), a medalist at the 1992 Junior Pan American Artistic Gymnastics Championships
Martin Fournier (writer), Canadian historian and children's writer